The Type 909 weapon trial ship (NATO reporting name: Wuhu-B class) and its successor Type 909A Dahua class are Chinese weapon trials ships developed for its People's Liberation Army Navy (PLAN). A total of three ships have entered service as of mid-2014.

Type 909
The Type 909 is the second purposely built weapon trial ship in PLAN, and in addition to conducting weapon trials for missiles, guns and rockets, the ship is also tasked to test electronic systems such as radars, communication systems and electronic intelligence and warfare systems. Designed to first supplement and then eventually replace the Yanxi-class weapon trials ship that entered service more than three decades earlier, The Type 909 has received NATO reporting name Wuhu-B class. The design incorporates specially designed accommodations for research crew to carry out their mission.  The pennant number of Type 909 went through several changes, originally 909, and this was changed to 970 to avoid confusing with the type number. Subsequently, the pennant number was changed to 891. Originally only with pennant number but without any name, the ship was finally formally named as Bi Sheng on October 10, 2002. Specification
Displacement (t): 4630
Speed (kt): 18
Propulsion: 2 diesel engines @ 14000 hp
Range (nm): 3,000

Type 909A
Nearly one and half a decades after the first Type 909 entered service, a successor Type 909A entered PLAN service as Hua Luogeng. Currently, assignments are split between two ships, with Bi Sheng (# 891) tasked to conduct trials for missiles launched from container/launcher, while Hua Luogeng (#892) tasked to test all missiles that are vertically launched from vertical launching systems. However, it must be said that such division of work is only due to administrative purposes, not technical limitations, as both ships are capable of conducting trials for both vertically launched missiles and non vertically launched.

The most distinct difference between Type 909A and its predecessor Type 909 is that the former is slightly larger, with greater range. Also becomes visually identifiable is that Type 909A has a raised bow breakwater to reduce water over the bow and a never-before-seen 30-foot-tall, 3-foot-diameter satellite communications antenna on the forecastle. Type 909A ship has an enclosed foremast instead of the latticework mast structures found on prior vessels. In 2012, an even larger Type 910 weapon trials ship with pennant number 893 based on experience of the Type 909 and 909A entered PLAN service, but was first mistaken for Type 909A. Type 909A has received the NATO reporting name Dahua class, while Type 910 received the NATO reporting name Dahua-II. Specifications:
Displacement (t): 5,000
Speed (kt): 18
Propulsion: 2 diesel engines
Range (nm): 5,000

Ships
Type 909 and 909A weapon trial ships are named after Chinese scientists.

References

Auxiliary ships of the People's Liberation Army Navy